Nationality words link to articles with information on the nation's poetry or literature (for instance, Irish or France).

Events

Works published

Great Britain
 Anonymous, A Hermeticall Banquet, published this year, although the book states "1652"; some attribute the book to James Howell, others to Thomas Vaughan
 William Bosworth, The shaft and Lost Lovers
 John Cleveland, Poems, this "sixth edition" has 28 poems, including 23 from the fifth edition of The Character of a London Diurnall 1647 and an additional prose work, "The Character of a Country Committee-Man, with the Ear-Mark of a Sequestrator"; many more editions followed
 Sir William Davenant, Gondibert: An heroick poem, also known simply as Gondibert, including Davenant's "Preface to his most honour’d friend Mr. Hobs" and "The Answer of Mr. Hobbes to Sir William D’Avenant’s Preface before Gondibert" by Thomas Hobbes, to whom the book is dedicated; also including commendatory verses by Edmund Waller and Abraham Cowley (first published in 1650 unfinished, then published again this year; the official second edition in 1653 includes verses by Davenant's friends; see also The Seventh and Last Canto''' [...] of Gondibert 1685)
 'A Scholler in Oxford', Newes from the Dead, or a True and Exact Narration of the Miraculous Deliverance of Anne Greene; whereunto are prefixed certain Poems casually written upon that subject, includes Latin verses by Christopher Wren
 Sir Edward Sherburne, Salmacis. Lyrian & Sylvia. Forsaken Lydia. The Rape of Helen., the book was also published in another edition this year, titled Poems and Translations, Amorous, Lusory, Morall, Divine Henry Vaughan, Olor Iscanus: A collection of some select poems, and translations, includes four prose translations
 Sir Henry Wotton, Reliquiae Wottonianae: Or, a collection of lives, letters, poems, poetry and prose, including "The Life of Sir Henry Wotton" by Izaak Walton; posthumously published

Other
 Isaac de Benserade, Job'', a sonnet; France

Births
Death years link to the corresponding "[year] in poetry" article:
 February 25 – Quirinus Kuhlmann (burned at the stake 1689), German Baroque poet and mystic
 September 26 – Francis Daniel Pastorius (died 1720), English Colonial American Quaker settler, founder of Germantown, Pennsylvania and poet
 November 12 – Juana Inés de la Cruz (died 1695), self-taught Novohispanic scholar, nun, poet and writer
 Mary Mollineux, née Southworth (died 1696), English Quaker poet

Deaths
Birth years link to the corresponding "[year] in poetry" article:
 October 6 – Heinrich Albert (born 1604), German composer and poet
 December 6 – Anna Visscher (born 1584), Dutch artist, poet and translator
 Lady Mary Wroth (born 1586), English poet

See also

 Poetry
 17th century in poetry
 17th century in literature
 Cavalier poets in England, who supported the monarch against the puritans in the English Civil War

Notes

17th-century poetry
Poetry